Zolotukhin (feminine: Zolotukhina) is a Russian-language surname. It may refer to:

Anatoly Zolotukhin, Russian expert in petrol and natural gas industry
Valeri Zolotukhin, Russian actor
, Russian actor
Nataliya Zolotukhina, Ukrainian hammer thrower

Russian-language surnames